Whoopi Goldberg is an American actress, comedian, and singer. The following is her filmography throughout her entire acting career. She has won Academy, Emmy, Grammy, and Tony Awards. She won the Academy Award for the Best Supporting Actress for the film Ghost (1990).

Film

Documentary

Television

Theatre

Video game

References

External links
 

Actress filmographies
American filmographies